In Hinduism, Banka-Mundi is a goddess of the hunt and fertility.
Hindus worship Banka-Mundi for protection against the wild animals of the forests  said to remove fear and provide fertility.

Hindu goddesses
Fertility goddesses
Hunting goddesses